Alexander Mikaberidze (born 27 January 1978) is a Georgian lawyer, author and historian who specializes in Napoleonic studies. He is a full professor of history and social sciences at Louisiana State University in Shreveport, where he holds the Ruth Herring Noel Endowed Chair for the Curatorship of the James Smith Noel Collection, one of the largest private collections of antiquarian books, prints, and maps in the United States.

Education and career
Mikaberidze was born in 1978 in Aktobe, Kazakh SSR, where his parents were working. In 1990, they returned to the Georgian SSR, which gained independence in 1991.

He graduated from Tbilisi State University in 1999 with a degree in international law. From 1996 to 2000, he worked with the Ministry of Foreign Affairs of Georgia, where he handled human rights issues and relations with the Council of Europe.

Napoleonic studies
Mikaberidze is a specialist on Napoleonic studies and the Napoleonic era. In 1999, Mikaberidze was one of the founding members of the Napoleonic Society of Georgia, dedicated to the study of the Revolutionary and Napoleonic eras (1799-1815). In 2000, he moved to the United States to devote himself to Napoleonic studies. Mikaberidze graduated with a Ph.D. in history in 2003 from the Institute on Napoleon and the French Revolution at Florida State University. He has taught at  Florida State University and Mississippi State University, and lectured on strategy and policy at the U.S. Naval War College. Since 2007, he has been at Louisiana State University in Shreveport.

Mikaberidze has been the author, editor, and translator of over two dozen books and textbooks. His books The Russian Officer Corps in the Revolutionary and Napoleonic Wars, 1792-1815 and The Battle of Borodino: Napoleon versus Kutuzov won the Literary Award of the International Napoleonic Society for 2005 and 2007, respectively. His book, The Napoleonic Wars: A Global History, published by Oxford University Press in 2020, won the Gilder Lehrman Military History Prize and the Society for Military History's Distinguished Book Award in 2021. His latest book, Kutuzov: A Life in War and Peace, published by Oxford University Press in 2022, won the Society for Military History's Distinguished Book Award in 2023.

He is on the editorial boards of the international journal Napoleonica La Revue, "an online review which aims to promote research in the history of the First and Second French Empires". Napoleonica La Revue, "published by the Fondation Napoléon, is academic, multidisciplinary, international and peer-reviewed". He has served the editor-in-chief of the periodical The Napoleonic Scholarship and an editor of the Select Papers of the Consortium on the Revolutionary Era.

For his contributions to Napoleonic studies, Mikaberidze has been elected a Fellow of the Royal Historical Society of the United Kingdom, and awarded the International Napoleonic Society's Legion of Merit Medal and La Renaissance Française's Médaille d'or du Rayonnement Culturel.

History of Islam

Alexander Mikaberidze edited Conflict and Conquest in the Islamic World: A Historical Encyclopedia, a two-volume encyclopedia covering the military and political history of Islam, and published in 2011.

The encyclopedia  contains more than 600 entries from dozens of contributors, as well as a glossary, maps and photographs.

Notable works 
  
  
 
 
 
 
 
 
 
 
 
 
 
 
 
 
 
 

 
 
 
 
 
  [Protection of Human Rights and Basic Freedoms within the Council of Europe Framework: European Court on Human Rights], Judge's Library Series. Tbilisi: GCI. 2000.

References

External links 
 Profile and bibliography — LSUS
 The James Smith Noel Collection — LSUS
  — C-SPAN 
 Mikaberidze interview  — The Fondation Napoléon
  Biography — National Parliamentary Library of Georgia

1978 births
Living people
Writers from Tbilisi
People from Aktobe
Tbilisi State University alumni
Florida State University alumni
Louisiana State University Shreveport faculty
Fellows of the Royal Historical Society
21st-century historians from Georgia (country)
Translators from Georgia (country)
Military historians
Historians of the Napoleonic Wars
21st-century translators
21st-century male writers